The Observer is a student newspaper the University of Notre Dame, Saint Mary's College and Holy Cross College. The Observer is distributed in print across the three campuses and is funded by both advertising revenue and a campus fee paid by students attending Notre Dame, Saint Mary's College, and Holy Cross College.

It is ordinarily published in print on weekdays when the university is in session by a staff of students from Notre Dame, Saint Mary's College and Holy Cross College. Since the outbreak of COVID-19 the newspaper has moved to publishing three days per week. The newspaper is based in the basement of Notre Dame's South Dining Hall.

History
The Observer, established in 1966, is the oldest student-run newspaper at Notre Dame. According to its website, The Observer is an independent student-run publication and claims to not have any editorial oversight from the University of Notre Dame, Saint Mary’s College, nor Holy Cross College. It has won some awards. On 21 August 2020, The Observer received press attention when the newspaper ran a front-page editorial entitled "Don't Make Us Write Obituaries".

Controversies

Allegations of editorial bias 
In 1987, when some students believed that The Observer began to show a conservative bias, a liberal newspaper, Common Sense was published; which has since folded. In 2003, when other students believed that the paper had a left-leaning bias, they started The Irish Rover, a twice-monthly publication that features regular columns from alumni and faculty in addition to coverage of campus matters. As of 2005, The Observer and The Irish Rover were distributed on the campus of the University of Notre Dame.

On October 15, 2020, The Observer ran a front page in which a talk by former Speaker of the House Paul Ryan was placed above a story describing an on-campus event involving Angela Davis. After receiving a single comment on "social media criticizing the page layout for placing greater emphasis on the former speaker’s lecture rather than the legendary Black academic’s." Editor-in-Chief Maria Leontaras and Managing Editor Mariah Rush responded to the criticism in a column dated on October 16, the following day, stating that "[w]hile Ryan’s former position and political stature warrant a top space in a typical newsroom, The Observer is working toward becoming a more socially aware outlet. This means highlighting stories, such as Davis’, that represent historically marginalized communities in our institutions."

"Modern Savagery" 
In 1995, The Observer published a letter to the editor by sophomore Nikole Hannah titled "Modern Savagery". In this letter, Hannah wrote that Africans arrived in the New World during the time of the Olmec civilization, a claim which is widely rejected by mainstream anthropologists. Tom McLaughlin of The Conway Daily Sun took issue with the letter's accusation that whites are engaged in a conspiracy to pump "drugs and guns into the black community."

"The Legging Problem" 
On March 25, 2019, The Observer published a letter to the editor by Maryanne White titled "The Leggings Problem". According to the BBC, White described that "while attending a Mass service at the Catholic university with her family, a group of women in front of her wore 'snug-fitting leggings' and 'short-waisted tops'." According to the Arkansas Democrat-Gazette, "[s]tudents held pro-leggings protests at the University of Notre Dame after a self-described 'Catholic mother of four sons' wrote [the] letter in the student newspaper saying that 'leggings are so naked, so form-fitting, so exposing.'"

Alumni 

 George Dohrmann - 2000 Pulitzer Prize winner for beat reporting
 Bryan Gruley - Pulitzer Prize Winner
Nikole Hannah-Jones - Pulitzer Prize Winner

References

External links

The Observer print edition - issuu.com
The Observer archives 1966-2016

Student newspapers published in Indiana
Independent newspapers published in the United States
University of Notre Dame
Saint Mary's College (Indiana)
Notre Dame, Indiana